A prank or practical joke is a mischievous trick played on someone. 

The Prank is a 2022 American film.

Prank or The Prank may also refer to:

 Prank (film), a 2016 Canadian film
 Prank (The Batman), a character in the 2004 TV series The Batman
 Prank (The Flash), a character in some versions of The Flash
 "The Prank" (Chowder episode), a 2010 episode of the TV show Chowder